Qatur is a city in Khoy County, West Azerbaijan Province, Iran.

Qatur or Qotur or Gottour ( and ) may also refer to places in:

Egypt
Qutur, Egypt, a city in Gharbia Governorate

Iran
 Qatur, Shahin Dezh, West Azerbaijan Province
 Qatur River, West Azerbaijan Province
 Qatur District, in Khoy County
 Qatur Rural District, in Khoy County